New Alipore is an upscale and standard locality in South Kolkata.

Description

Geography
New Alipore is bordered on the north by the Budge Budge section of the Kolkata Suburban Railway between Majerhat and Tollygunge stations. It is bounded by B.L. Saha Road (Chetla) to the east, Diamond Harbour Road to the west and by Behala to the south.

History
New Alipore was created as a planned residential suburb of Kolkata by the Kolkata Metropolitan Development Authority in the 1950s to house the burgeoning population of the city.

New Alipore was already the location of the India Government Mint, built in the 1930s. Next to the mint lies the Centenary Port Trust Hospital, built in 1971..

Transport
New Alipore has two railway stations, New Alipore railway station and Majerhat railway station on the Budge Budge section of the Kolkata Suburban Railway and Kolkata Circular Railway.

New Alipore is connected to all parts of the city by extensive bus services. The Diamond Harbour Road is part of NH 117. The erstwhile Kalighat Falta Railway (KFR) has been dismantled and the space reclaimed. The stretch where once the tracks lay is now the James Long Sarani. This road runs parallel to the Diamond Harbour Road and through Behala and Thakurpukur.

Police district
New Alipore is served by New Alipore police station: it is part of the South division of Kolkata Police. Tollygunge Women's police station has jurisdiction over all the police districts in the South Division.

Gallery

See also
 :Category:People from New Alipore

References

 
Neighbourhoods in Kolkata